In Serbo-Croatian, hrvatski is the masculine adjectival form meaning "Croatian", both in the plural and singular; it is hrvatska in the feminine singular, hrvatske in the feminine plural, hrvatsko in the neutral singular, hrvatska in the neutral plural. The word hrvatski is also used to refer to the Croatian language (the standard variety of Serbo-Croatian used by Croats), whereas Hrvatska (first letter capital) is the native name for Croatia, the country. As such, all four forms (hrvatski, hrvatska, hrvatske and hrvatsko) commonly appear in native names of many Croatian government institutions, companies, political parties, organisations and sports clubs, as well as some place names. It may refer to:

Organisations and companies
 Hrvatska akademija znanosti i umjetnosti or HAZU, Croatian Academy of Sciences and Arts
 Hrvatska elektroprivreda or HEP, national power company
 Hrvatska pošta or HP, Croatian Post
 Hrvatska radiotelevizija or HRT, national broadcasting corporation
 Hrvatske autoceste or HAC, national motorways company
 Hrvatske ceste (literally "Croatian Roads"), state-owned road maintenance company
 Hrvatske željeznice or HŽ, Croatian Railways
 Hrvatski autoklub or HAK, Croatian Automobile Club
 Hrvatski nogometni savez or HNS, Croatian Football Federation
 T-Hrvatski Telekom or T-HT, Croatian telecom company
 Hrvatsko ratno zrakoplovstvo i protuzračna obrana or Croatian Air Force and Air Defence

Political parties
 Hrvatska demokratska zajednica or HDZ (Croatian Democratic Union)
 Hrvatska narodna stranka or HNS (Croatian People's Party)
 Hrvatska seljačka stranka or HSS (Croatian Peasant Party)
 Hrvatska stranka prava or HSP (Croatian Party of Rights)

Places
 Hrvatsko Zagorje, a region in northern Croatia
 Hrvatsko primorje, a region in western Croatia
 Hrvatska Dubica, village in central Croatia
 Hrvatska Kostajnica, small town in central Croatia
 Hrvatski Leskovac, village near Zagreb

The adjective is also used in:
 NK Hrvatski dragovoljac (lit. Croatian Volunteer), association football club based in Zagreb
 Hrvatski Band Aid, Croatian supergroup notable for recording the charity single Moja domovina in 1991
 Hrvatski Idol, Croatian version of the television talent show Pop Idol which aired between 2003 and 2005
 Hrvatski Top Model Croatian version of the reality television series America's Next Top Model
 Stadion Hrvatski vitezovi, association football stadium in Dugopolje, literally meaning "Croatian Knights Stadium"

In addition, the term as such is used in:
 Hrvatski, pseudonym of the American electronic music artist Keith Fullerton Whitman (b. 1973)

See also
 Croatian (disambiguation)